Noreen Coen is a camogie player, a member of the Galway senior panel that unsuccessfully contested the All Ireland finals of 2010 and 2011 against Wexford,

Other awards
All Ireland Minor 2004.

References

External links
 Camogie.ie Official Camogie Association Website

1993 births
Living people
Galway camogie players